UZ Pyxidis (HD 75021) is a semiregular variable star in the constellation Pyxis. It is located about 3,600 light-years (1,100 parsecs) away from the Earth.

UZ Pyxidis lies directly between α and γ Pyxidis. It has a common proper motion companion, HD 75022, less than 2' away but the two are not listed in double star catalogues.

UZ Pyxidis is a carbon star. These types of stars are known for having large amounts of carbon in their atmospheres, forming carbon compounds that make the star appear strikingly red. It was first recognised as having an unusual spectrum in 1893. Under the Morgan–Keenan classification of carbon stars, UZ Pyxidis' spectral type is C55; if it were a normal giant star, this would correspond to a spectral type of about K5. It is also unusual in that it has very strong isotopic bands of C2 and CN.

UZ Pyxidis is classified as a semiregular variable with a dominant period of 159.6 days. It varies in brightness between magnitude 6.99 and 7.63. The variability was first reported in 1972, and the variable star designation UZ Pyxidis was assigned in 1978.

References

Pyxis (constellation)
Semiregular variable stars
Pyxidis, UZ
075021
043093
CD-29 06735
Carbon stars